The Masque of Anarchy (or The Mask of Anarchy) is a British political poem written in 1819 (see 1819 in poetry) by Percy Bysshe Shelley following the Peterloo Massacre of that year. In his call for freedom, it is perhaps the first modern statement of the principle of nonviolent resistance.

The poem was not published during Shelley's lifetime and did not appear in print until 1832 (see 1832 in poetry), when published by Edward Moxon in London with a preface by Leigh Hunt. Shelley had sent the manuscript in 1819 for publication in The Examiner. Hunt withheld it from publication because he "thought that the public at large had not become sufficiently discerning to do justice to the sincerity and kind-heartedness of the spirit that walked in this flaming robe of verse". The epigraph on the cover of the first edition is from Shelley's The Revolt of Islam (1818): "Hope is strong; Justice and Truth their winged child have found."

Use of masque and mask is discussed by Morton Paley; Shelley used mask in the manuscript but the first edition uses masque in the title. The poem has 372 lines, largely in four-line quatrains; two more quatrains appear in some manuscript versions.

Synopsis
Shelley begins his poem, written on the occasion of the Peterloo Massacre, Manchester 1819, with the powerful images of the unjust forms of authority of his time, "God, and King, and Law" – and then imagines the stirrings of a radically new form of social action: "Let a great assembly be, of the fearless, of the free". The crowd at this gathering is met by armed soldiers, but the protesters do not raise an arm against their assailants:

Shelley elaborates on the psychological consequences of violence met with pacifism. The guilty soldiers, he says, will return shamefully to society, where "blood thus shed will speak / In hot blushes on their cheek". Women will point out the murderers on the streets, their former friends will shun them, and honourable soldiers will turn away from those responsible for the massacre, "ashamed of such base company". A version was taken up by Henry David Thoreau in his essay Civil Disobedience, and later by Mahatma Gandhi in his doctrine of Satyagraha. Gandhi's passive resistance was influenced and inspired by Shelley's nonviolence in protest and political action. It is known that Gandhi would often quote Shelley's The Masque of Anarchy to vast audiences during the campaign for a free India.

The poem mentions several members of Lord Liverpool's government by name: the Foreign Secretary, Castlereagh, who appears as a mask worn by Murder, the Home Secretary, Lord Sidmouth, whose guise is taken by Hypocrisy, and the Lord Chancellor, Lord Eldon, whose ermine gown is worn by Fraud. Led by Anarchy, a skeleton with a crown, they try to take over England, but are slain by a mysterious armoured figure who arises from a mist. The maiden Hope, revived, then calls to the people of England:

Literary criticism
Political authors and campaigners such as Richard Holmes and Paul Foot, among others, describe it as "the greatest political poem ever written in English". In his book An Encyclopedia of Pacifism, Aldous Huxley noted the poem's exhortation to the English to resist assault without fighting back, stating "The Method of resistance inculcated by Shelley in The Mask of Anarchy is the method of non-violence".

Author, educator, and activist Howard Zinn refers to the poem in A People's History of the United States. In a subsequent interview, he underscored the power of the poem, suggesting: "What a remarkable affirmation of the power of people who seem to have no power. Ye are many, they are few. It has always seemed to me that poetry, music, literature, contribute very special power." In particular, Zinn uses "The Mask of Anarchy" as an example of literature that members of the American labour movement would read to other workers to inform and educate them.

Use in politics
The rallying language of the poem had led to elements of it being used by political movements. It was recited by students at the Tiananmen Square protests of 1989 and by protesters in Tahrir Square during the Egyptian revolution of 2011. The phrase "like lions after slumber, in unvanquishable number" from the poem was used as a motto/slogan by the International Socialist Organization in their organ. The line "Ye are many-they are few" inspired the campaign slogan "We are many, they are few" used by protesters during the Poll tax riots of 1989–90 in the United Kingdom, and also inspired the title of the 2014 documentary film We Are Many, which focused on the global 15 February 2003 anti-war protests.

Jeremy Corbyn, the former leader of the British Labour Party, quoted the final stanza from the poem at his rally in Islington, on the final day of campaigning for the 2017 general election. Corbyn subsequently quoted the final stanza again during his speech at the Pyramid stage at the 2017 Glastonbury Festival. Academic and writer John Sutherland has suggested that the title of the party's 2017 manifesto, "For the Many, Not the few", was derived from the poem. The phrase 'a community in which power, wealth and opportunity are in the hands of the many, not the few' also appears in the revised version of Clause IV of the Labour Party Constitution. 

The same variation, "For The Many, Not The Few", was the sub-title to Robert Reich's 2016 book, Saving Capitalism.

The poem was also quoted on the back cover of The Jam's 1980 album Sound Affects.

References

Further reading 

Crampton, Daniel Nicholas. "Shelley's Political Optimism: 'The Mask of Anarchy' to Hellas." PhD dissertation, University of Wisconsin-Madison, 1973.
Cross, Ashley J. "What a World we Make the Oppressor and the Oppressed": George Cruikshank, Percy Shelley, and the Gendering of Revolution in 1819." ELH, Volume 71, Number 1, Spring 2004, pp. 167–207.
Dick, Alex J. "The Ghost of Gold: Forgery Trials and the Standard of Value in Shelley's The Mask of Anarchy." European Romantic Review, Volume 18, Number 3, July 2007, pp. 381–400.
Edwards, Thomas R. Imagination and Power: A Study of Poetry on Public Themes. NY: Oxford University Press, 1971.
Forman, H. Buxton. Shelley, 'Peterloo' and 'The Mask of Anarchy'. London: Richard Clay & Sons, 1887.
Franta, Andrew. "Shelley and the Poetics of Political Indirection." Poetics Today, Volume 22, Number 4, Winter 2001, pp. 765–793.
Frosch, Thomas. "Passive Resistance in Shelley: A Psychological View." Journal of English and Germanic Philology, 98.3 (1999): 373–95.
Hendrix, Richard. "The Necessity of Response: How Shelley's Radical Poetry Works." Keats-Shelley Journal, Vol. 27, (1978), pp. 45–69.
Jones, Steven E. "Shelley's Satire of Succession and Brecht's Anatomy of Regression: 'The Mask of Anarchy' and Der anachronistische Zug oder Freiheit und Democracy." Shelley: Poet and Legislator of the World. Eds. Betty T. Bennett and Stuart Curran. Baltimore: Johns Hopkins UP, 1996. 193–200.
Jones. Steven E. Shelley's Satire: Violence and Exhortation. DeKalb: Northern Illinois University Press, 1994.
Keach, William. "Rise Like Lions? Shelley and the Revolutionary Left." International Socialism, 75, July 1997.
Kuiken, Kir. "Shelley's 'Mask of Anarchy' and the Problem of Modern Sovereignty." Literature Compass, Volume 8, Issue 2, pages 95–106, February 2011.
Paley, Morton D. "Apocapolitics: Allusion and Structure in Shelley's Mask of Anarchy." Huntington Library Quarterly, 54 (1991): 91–109.
Peterfreund, Stuart. "Teaching Shelley's Anatomy of Anarchy." Hall, Spencer (ed.). Approaches to Teaching Shelley's Poetry. New York: MLA, 1990. 90–92.
Scrivener, Michael Henry. "Reviewed work(s): Shelley's Satire: Violence and Exhortation by Steven E. Jones." Studies in Romanticism, Vol. 35, No. 3, Green Romanticism (Fall, 1996), pp. 471–473.
Scrivener, Michael. Radical Shelley. Princeton: Princeton UP, 1982.
Stauffer, Andrew M. "Celestial Temper: Shelley and the Masks of Anger." Keats-Shelley Journal. Vol. 49, (2000), pp. 138–161.
Thompson, E. P. The Making of the English Working Class. NY: Vintage Books, 1963.
Vargo, Lisa. "Unmasking Shelley's Mask of Anarchy." English Studies in Canada, 13.1 (1987): 49–64.

External links

Civil disobedience
Pacifism in the United Kingdom
Nonviolence
Poetry by Percy Bysshe Shelley
1819 poems
Political history of England